AIB Group (UK) plc v Mark Redler & Co Solicitors [2014] UKSC 58 is an English trust law case, concerning the applicable principles of causation for a breach of trust. It held that a "but for" test of causation applies for equitable compensation (although remoteness principles, e.g. from the Wagon Mound do not apply).

Facts
AIB Group (UK) plc claimed the full loss of a loan (£2.5m) from Mark Redler solicitors, measured when the money was paid away even though the value of the home on which the loan was secured had dropped. AIB Group (UK) plc had given £3.3m in a remortgage of a home, worth £4.25m at the time, to Mr and Mrs Sondhi in June 2006. A first charge on the house was in favour of Barclays Bank plc, for £1.5m, owed in two accounts. AIB's condition for the remortgage was that Barclays’ first charge would be redeemed. AIB contracted with Mark Redler solicitor to obtain the first legal charge, and redeem all other charges. Mark Redler sought information from Barclays about the two accounts, but got the figure about one account, and thought this was the total. One account discharged this, but it left an outstanding £309,000 debt. Barclays then refused to release its first charge unless this was paid. Mark Redler did not tell AIB of the mistake, but then made a deed of postponement, enabling AIB to register a second charge and limit Barclays’ priority to the outstanding amount. In February 2011, Mr and Mrs Sondhi defaulted on their repayments. Barclays repossessed and sold for the home for £1.2m, and AIB received £867,697. AIB, seeking to recover more, then claimed Mark Redler solicitors acted in breach of trust and fiduciary duty, breach of contract, and was negligent. It sought the full loan amount, minus the amount from the sale, namely around £2.5m. It asked for reconstitution of the fund paid away, equitable compensation and damages for breach of contract. Mark Redler accepted it acted breach of contract, but not other allegations. It also argued that in any case it should only be liable for loss by comparison with the position that AIB would be in if Mark Redler had done what it should (registering the first charge) that around £275,000. It should not be responsible for further losses attributable to general falls in the market price of the property.

The Judge held Mark Redler was in breach of trust, and awarded £273,777 as equitable compensation. The Court of Appeal held that the claim was not so limited, and MR had no authority to release any funds until the redemption statement, unless the first charge for AIB was registered, but upheld the judge's award.

Judgment
The Supreme Court held unanimously that if trust property is misapplied, the trustee should restore the trust fund to the position it would have been in but for the breach. If no longer there, it must pay money compensation on the same basis. Compensation was to be measured at the date of trial, on a common sense view of causation of losses flowing from the breach. Foreseeability of loss, however, was irrelevant. Principles of equity do not differ with the trust's nature. But principles of traditional trusts did not necessarily apply to bare trusts in a commercial contract. This defined the trust's parameters. It was part of the machinery for its performance. Contract terms were relevant for the but for test.

Lord Toulson gave the following judgment.

Lord Reed concurred and said the following.

Lord Neuberger, Baroness Hale and Lord Wilson agreed with both judgments.

See also

English trusts law

Notes

References

English trusts case law
Supreme Court of the United Kingdom cases
2014 in British law
2014 in case law